Wong Li Lin (born 30 August 1972) is a Singaporean media personality and businesswoman.  She was formerly an actress and host on Singaporean television.

Early life
Wong Li Lin is the youngest in a family of 4 siblings.  She has 3 elder brothers. She was educated at Haig Girls’ School and Temasek Secondary School.  She started ballet by chance at age 9 and started teaching at the age of 13 to supplement her fees.  Wong was awarded a scholarship to the Royal Ballet School in London, where she was appointed Head Girl.

In Singapore she pioneered Pilates, training many trainers who subsequently started their own studios.  She continued teaching prolifically and founded several dance projects.  She taught at Nanyang Academy of Fine Arts and founded several dance centres.  It was while teaching at Singapore's television station that she was discovered and started a career in the media.  Wong is most well-known for her portrayal as Inspector Elaine Tay in Triple Nine. She is a bilingual actress and host.

Wong took time away from showbiz when she was awarded a second scholarship for her Master's degree in Anthropology at University of Surrey.  She wrote her dissertation on Falun Gong as it combined her interests in movement, spirituality and her heritage as a Chinese diaspora.  Wong graduated in 2001.

Professional background
Wong Li Lin made her television debut in 1994 and has acted in dramas such as Masters of the Sea (1994) and Rising Expectations (长河) (1997). She became a household name for her lead role as Inspector Elaine Tay in Mediacorp Channel 5 cop drama Triple Nine (Season 1 and 2) from 1995 to 1997. After a brief hiatus from acting in 1999, she returned in 2001 and started acting frequently in Mediacorp Channel 8 dramas such as Love Me, Love Me Not (真爱无敌) (2001), The Challenge (谁与争锋) (2001) and The Reunion (顶天立地) (2001). She was also one of the four judges of the reality TV series "The Dance Floor".

In 2008, Wong starred in the Singapore romance film The Leap Years alongside Ananda Everingham, and was nominated for Best Performer in the Singapore Film Awards 2009. The movie was directed by Jean Yeo. She has also starred in several European movies and telemovies such as Love Under the Sign of the Dragon, The Tiger Team, Love in the Lion City, and The Patriarch.

Wong has held leadership roles across multiple sectors and served organisations such as Parkway Pantai, Thomson Medical as deputy director and in 2017, executive director of the Public Hygiene Council under National Environment Agency. She was most recently chief operating officer at a real estate and F&B firm.

Personal life
Wong married Chinese-American actor and host Allan Wu in Los Angeles in December 2003. They have two children, daughter Sage and son Jonas. Wong and Wu divorced in June 2013.

Filmography

Accolades

References 

Living people
Singaporean people of Chinese descent
Singaporean people of Hakka descent
People educated at the Royal Ballet School
Alumni of the University of Surrey
Singaporean television personalities
Singaporean television actresses
Singaporean film actresses
1972 births